Breda Lorenci-Babošek (born 16 July 1951) is a Slovenian retired athlete. She competed in the women's high jump at the 1972 Summer Olympics, representing Yugoslavia.

Babošek cleared 1.73m in the qualifying round in Munich and did not advance to the final.

Prior to her Olympic appearance, Babošek won the bronze medal in the high jump at the 1971 Mediterranean Games with a leap of 1.74m. She tied for 16th at the 1971 European Athletics Championships with a leap of 1.75m.

She competed in the pentathlon at the 1978 European Athletics Championships where she finished 16th with 4064 points.

Her personal best in the high jump was 1.83m set in Maribor in 1973.

Personal bests

All information from Slovenian Athletics Federation's all-time performance lists.

Two sources cite different personal bests for the pentathlon: World Athletics lists 4351 points in Thessaloniki, Greece, on 12 August 1978, and European Athletics lists 4029 points in Sofia, Bulgaria, on 12 August 1973.

References

External links
 
 Photo of Babošek with her coach Milan Lorenci at the 1972 Olympic Games in Munich (from the Slovenian Museum of Contemporary History's Section for Documentary Photography)

1951 births
Living people
Athletes (track and field) at the 1972 Summer Olympics
Slovenian female high jumpers
Olympic athletes of Yugoslavia
Sportspeople from Maribor
Mediterranean Games bronze medalists for Yugoslavia
Mediterranean Games medalists in athletics
Athletes (track and field) at the 1971 Mediterranean Games